Spring Valley Township is a township in Cherokee County, Kansas, USA.  As of the 2000 census, its population was 1,007.

Geography
According to the USGS, it contains seven cemeteries: Baxter Springs, Beasley, Brush Creek, Crum, Dockery, Pleasant View and Usrey.

The streams of Bitter Creek, Brush Creek and Willow Creek run through this township.

Transportation
Spring Valley Township contains one airport or landing strip, Walter A Swalley Airpark.

References
 USGS Geographic Names Information System (GNIS)

External links
 City-Data.com

Townships in Cherokee County, Kansas
Townships in Kansas